The Wales Interpretation and Translation Service (WITS; ; GCDC) is a not-for-profit quango providing 24-hour linguistic services to public authorities in Wales, including councils, police forces, health and social services, but not courts.

The services offered include interpreting, translation and transcription, and cover approximately 135 languages & dialects including British Sign Language. The linguists are security vetted to national police employment standards and assessed and trained in professional interpreting.

It has a place on the steering committee of Professional Interpreters for Justice (PI4J), an umbrella group formed in 2011 to campaign against the Ministry of Justice language services framework agreement.

History
WITS was created in November 2009 and formally established on 13 October 2010, with initial funding from the National Assembly for Wales, City of Cardiff Council and Gwent Police. The aims were to help people experiencing communication difficulties to overcome language barriers when accessing public services, and thereby to encourage social inclusion and integration, and improve community cohesion.

In January 2017 it was agreed to transfer hosting responsibilities from Gwent Police to Cardiff Council.

See also 
 Welsh Language Board 
 Association of Welsh Translators and Interpreters
 List of UK interpreting and translation associations

References

External links 
 WITS website
 WITS website (archive copy)

Further reading 
 MoJ Language Services Framework: independent review and the government response

Interpretation and Translation Service
Interpretation and Translation Service
Organizations established in 2010